Castle Rock Glacier is in the U.S. state of Montana. The glacier is situated south of Castle Rock Mountain in the Beartooth Mountains.

References

See also
 List of glaciers in the United States

Glaciers of Carbon County, Montana
Glaciers of Montana